Steinknückl is a low mountain in the Aschaffenburg district of Bavaria, Germany, on the western edge of the Spessart range of wooded low mountains. It is flanked by the communities of Laufach to the north and Waldaschaff to the south.

Its parent peak is the  Schwarzkopf  to the east.

References

Hills of Bavaria
Hills of the Spessart